General Houghton may refer to:

Kenneth J. Houghton (1920–2006), U.S. Marine Corps major general
Nick Houghton (born 1954), British Army general
Robert Houghton (1912–2011), Royal Marines major general